Sri Lanka's Got Talent (often abbreviated as SLGT) is a Sri Lankan television talent show which started in 2017 and originated from the Got Talent franchise. It is a Stein Studios production and will be aired on Sirasa TV. 
Contestants of any age, who possess some sort of talent, can audition for the show, with their performance judged by a panel of judges; the current lineup consists of Jackson Anthony, Soundarie David Rodrigo and Tillakaratne Dilshan. Those that make it through the auditions compete against other acts in a series of quarterfinals, and then the semifinals. Three acts are chosen in each quarterfinal by the judge board to move on to the semifinals.

Series 1 Overview

The preliminary rounds took place at E. L. Senanayake premises, Kandy on 30, 31 October and 1 November; at Mahinda College, Galle on 11 and 12 November and at Stein Studios on 24, 25 and 26 November.

Throughout the show, the contestants should perform in front of the judges. Audition round held in January 2018 and semifinals were chosen by the judge board. SMS round and public voting will only be available after the start of the live shows. The first television premier started on 18 March 2018 at 9 p.m.

Three golden buzzer acts were chosen straightly to the quarterfinals by each member of the judge panel. Jackson Anthony pressed the golden buzzer for the Gini Sisila (fire dance) act by Nipuni Sithara. Tillakaratne Dilshan pressed the golden buzzer for traditional Angampora dance act by the Sri Lanka Air Force. Musician N.S. Wageshan won the golden buzzer from judge Soundarie David Rodrigo.

After auditions, the judges further deliberated to reduce the number of contestants who passed the auditions to 56, which included 3 golden buzzer acts. 50 contestants were initially chosen for the quarterfinals and 3 wild card acts were later selected by the judges. This session was similar to 'judge cuts' and 'deliberation rounds' held in other got talent franchises. Some acts were required to perform again in order to be confidently chosen for the quarterfinals.

The winner of the show will be awarded Rs 10 million   
Quarterfinals was held from 17 June 2018 and will be held at Stein Studios, Colombo. 7 acts participated in each quarterfinal where 3 contestants chosen by the judge board moved onto the semifinals. Semifinals was aired from 12 August 2018 on wards where 6 acts participated in each semifinal, the jury selected one act to advance immediately to the finals, where the other 2 acts were selected based upon public vote. In each semifinal, one act received the judges decision, similar to the golden buzzer which allowed the act to immediately advance to the pre finals round of the competition. In semifinals 1, Nipuni Sithara, Jackson Anthony's golden buzzer won the judges decision to advance to the pre finals where Lahiru Perera acted as the guest judge. Dilhani Ekanayake was the guest judge in semifinals 2. Angampora pool, Tillakaratne Dilshan's golden buzzer act won the judges' decision to immediately advance to the pre finals. Circus acrobat M.G. Suminda was voted to immediately advance to pre final round as the judges' decision in semifinals 3 where Bathiya Jayakody, singer of the music duo Bathiya and Santhush acted as the guest judge.
The pre finals round was held in two separate episodes where 6 acts competed in each episode. At the end of the second episode, the judge board chose six acts to advance to the Grand Finale.

The Grand Finale was held on 30 September 2018 where Angampora Pool of the Sri Lanka Air Force won the 10 Million Rupees. Fast mental arithmetic act Nimna Hiranya received the runner up of the competition. Fire dance act, Nipuni Sithara received 3rd Place in the competition.

Series overview

References

 http://sirasatv.lk/
 https://www.news.com.au/entertainment/tv/reality-tv/sri-lankas-got-talents-sudarshana-deshappriya-proves-a-real-knockout/news-story/1510630f390db5f213fae9e2f5e171f7
 http://www.stein-studios.com/slgt/

Sri Lankan television shows
Non-British television series based on British television series
Sirasa TV original programming